National Alliance (in Spanish: Alianza Nacional), was a political party in Peru in 1947 by Pedro Beltrán Espantoso.

1947 establishments in Peru
Defunct political parties in Peru
Political parties established in 1947
Political parties with year of disestablishment missing